Kabe Dan Kumbari, known as Alhaji Kabe, was the thirty-ninth ruler of the Sultanate of Kano, reigning for the ten year period between 1743 and 1753. He was primarily remembered by the Kano Chronicle as a malevolent and ruthless King. It is said that no record can be kept of the number of battles and wars he fought or those fought by the subkingdoms of Kano by his orders, most notably against Gobir. The baleful nature of his reign led to the ousting of the already unpopular bloodline of Muhammad Sharefa.

Ascension 
He was the son of Kumbari and Zenabu, who was also known as "Zama". He is also a descendant of the Gaya Noble House, through is paternal grandmother, Maidaki Mariamma. He succeeded his father as Sultan in 1743.

Reign 
"He was a Sarki of many wars and terrible. From the time he obtained the kingdom he did not remain five months in his house. without going to war or sending out his Sarkis to fight."

The Chronicle noted that there was no man of Kabe's age who killed as mercilessly as he did. However, despite his bellicose nature, he was said to have been very generous towards religious scholars because he feared for his soul in the afterlife.

War with Gobir 
"Sarkin Gobir sent to try and make peace with him but Kabe refused. He sent to Sarkin Gobir Barbari, saying, 'I have a cap to fit anyone's head'."

An inconclusive war erupted between Gobir under Sarkin Gobir Soba and Kano under Kabe's father, Kumbari. Gobir's aggression towards Kano was believed to be under the orders of the Mai Ali of Bornu. The Sultan of Gobir during Kabe's time, Baribari (another name for Kanuri), sought to make peace with Kano but was ardently rebuffed. He soon made for Kano and their armies clashed at Dami. It is said that the men of Kano, bar the Royal Guard (Dogarai) and a faction known as the "Kwinkele" deserted Alhaji Kabe fearing the "magic", the men of Gobir possessed. Among the high ranking Kano officials, only the Sarkin Dawaki and Turakin Kuka (Chief of Eunuchs) remained. The army of Gobir charged towards him and he barely escaped with his life. This show of disunity was evidence of dissent within the Kano Nobility and the unpopularity of Alhaji Kabe. Kano and Gobir continued to engage in frequent battles until Kabe's death.

Death and succession 
Alhaji Kabe died in 1753 but not before causing much havoc in the Sultanate. The Kingmakers elected his grandfathers brother and bitter rival, Yaji, who had a more peaceful disposition as Sultan. Yaji was known as "Mallam Mai Lafia" because of his meek nature.

Biography in the Kano Chronicle
Below is a full biography of Alhaji Kabe from Palmer's 1908 English translation of the Kano Chronicle.

References 

18th-century monarchs in Africa
Monarchs of Kano
1753 deaths
Year of birth unknown